Dr. Jagannathrao Hegde (born 1943) is a former Sheriff of Mumbai. His term was of two years and took over on 23 December 2003. Hegde is a dental surgeon.

References

1943 births
Living people
Medical doctors from Mumbai
Sheriffs of Mumbai
Indian dentists
20th-century Indian medical doctors